Wolfgang Lotz (born April 19, 1912 in Heilbronn; died October 24, 1981 in Rome) was a German art historian specialized in Italian Renaissance architecture.

Life and work
Lotz first studied Law in Freiburg im Breisgau and then art history at the Universities of Munich and Hamburg, where he was a student of Ludwig Heinrich Heydenreich. In 1937, he completed his Ph.D. dissertation on Giacomo Barozzi da Vignola's architecture. He first worked at the Kunsthistorisches Institut in Florenz, and after his return from military service he was assigned to the International Commission for Monuments in Munich. Then he worked (under Heydenreich as director) as deputy director at the Zentralinstitut für Kunstgeschichte in Munich. In 1952, he  was appointed professor of art at Vassar, replacing Richard Krautheimer. In 1959, he again replaced Krautheimer, this time at the Institute of Fine Arts, New York University. From 1962 on, he was director of the Bibliotheca Hertziana – Max Planck Institute of Art History in Rome.

In 1974, he published, with Heydenreich, his most popular book, the 38th volume of the Pelican History of Art, entitled The Architecture in Italy: 1400-1600. It presents a survey of Italian Renaissance architecture in the Cinquecento, discussing the work of Donato Bramante, Giulio Romano, Michelangelo, and Andrea Palladio, among others, as well as the various centers of architectural activity throughout Italy. Three years later, Lotz published a selection of essays entitled, Studies in Italian Renaissance Architecture.

Select publications
Vignola-Studien: Beiträge zu einer Vignola-Monographie. Würzburg-Aumühle: K. Triltsch, 1939. 
"Die ovalen Kirchenräume des Cinquecento." Römisches Jahrbuch für Kunstgeschichte, vol. 7 (1955), pp. 7–99. 
The Northern Renaissance. New York: Abrams, 1955.
"Redefinitions of Style: Architecture in the Later 16th Century." College Art Journal, vol. 17 (1958), pp. 129–39.
"Mannerism in Architecture. Changing Aspects". In The Renaissance and Mannerism – Studies in Western Art: Acts of the Twentieth International Congress of the History of Art II. Princeton, N.J. 1963, pp. 239–246. 
"Die Spanische Treppe. Architektur als Mittel der Diplomatie." In Römisches Jahrbuch für Kunstgeschichte, vol. 12, 1969, pp. 39–94.
(with Ludwig H. Heydenreich), Architecture in Italy, 1400 to 1600. Baltimore, MD: Penguin Books, 1974. 
Studies in Italian Renaissance Architecture. Cambridge, MA: MIT Press, 1977.

References

Further reading
Werner Oechslin, "In memoriam Wolfgang Lotz", Daidalos, 2, December 15, 1981, p. 114.
Christoph Luitpold Frommel, "In memoria di Wolfgang Lotz", Odeo olimpico, vol. 17-18, 1981/82, pp. 181–182.
James S. Ackerman, "In memoriam Wolfgang Lotz", Journal of the Society of Architectural Historians, volume 41, 1982, pp. 5–6.
Lectures in Memory of Wolfgang Lotz. Institute of Fine Arts, New York, 1983.
Klaus Gütlein, "Der 'Palazzo Nuovo' des Kapitols: In memoriam Wolfgang Lotz", Römisches Jahrbuch für Kunstgeschichte, volume 22, 1985, pp. 83–190.

External links
Dictionary of Art Historians: Lotz, Wolfgang

German art historians
German male non-fiction writers
20th-century German historians
1912 births
1981 deaths
People from Heilbronn
German expatriates in Italy
Max Planck Institute directors